Dark Nebula is a two-player science fiction board wargame published by Game Designers' Workshop (GDW) in 1980. Dark Nebula is the seventh Traveller boardgame published by GDW. A second edition was published in 1983 with a new cover. It was republished in 2004 as part of Far Future Enterprises Traveller: The Classic Games, Games 1-6+.

Gameplay
Dark Nebula is a strategic game about space combat which is based on the previously published Imperium board game. Dark Nebula was part of a series produced by GDW called "Series 120" — games with 120 pieces that were designed to be learned and played in 120 minutes. The names of the opposing forces, the Solomani Confederation and the Aslan Hierate, are taken from GDW's Traveller science fiction role-playing game.

Components
The game comes with a rule book, 120 counters representing the various ships and troops, and an astromorphic map consisting of 8" x 5.5" sections that can be placed in various configurations.

Scenarios
Specific scenarios are not offered, but a mechanism is given to randomly build the map, and also to randomly select neutral forces that will be on the map with the two opposing forces.

Reception
Colin Reynolds reviewed Dark Nebula for White Dwarf #20, giving it an overall rating of 9 out of 10, and stated that "Dark Nebula is full of colour, reflected both in the sense of visual appreciation and of variety in play. The game is well balanced, fast and furious, and deserves to be placed alongside its fore-runner as a classic."

In the September 1980 edition of Dragon (Issue #41), Roberto Camino thought Dark Nebula did not compare well to its predecessor, Imperium. He found this to be especially true of the smaller and less informative cardboard counters, commenting that "Something was lost in the passage to Dark Nebula's counter mix." Camino did find the ships in this game more powerful than Imperium, and welcomed the addition of armor units. But he noted that the presence of only one fuel tanker for each fleet "tends to funnel operations." Camino thought the game's biggest flaw was its lack of balance: "What does not seem to vary is the fate of the Aslans. They appear doomed to be the vassals of the Solomani. The Solomani have 20% greater resources, and their capital is more easily defended [...] It seems that an otherwise outstanding buy for six dollars may be fatally marred by play balance."

In the November 1980 edition of The Space Gamer (Issue No. 33), Forrest Johnson thought Dark Nebula was not as good as its predecessor, Imperium, saying, "If you have a copy of Imperium, there is no reason to invest in Dark Nebula. If you don't own Imperium, buy it - and forget about Dark Nebula.

Reviews
Asimov's Science Fiction v8 n4 (1984 04)

See also
Traveller boardgames

References

External links

Board games introduced in 1980
Game Designers' Workshop games
GDW Series 120 games
Traveller (role-playing game) board games